Black Tears is a lost 1927 silent film society drama directed by John Gorman and starring Bryant Washburn. An independent production from director Gorman released through B movie Hollywood Pictures.

Cast
Bryant Washburn
Vola Vale 
Jack Richardson
Hedda Hopper
Melbourne MacDowell

References

External links
 Black Tears at IMDb.com

1927 films
American silent feature films
Lost American films
American black-and-white films
Silent American drama films
1927 drama films
1927 lost films
Lost drama films
1920s American films